Wade Cornelius (born 5 March 1978) is a New Zealand cricketer. He played in fourteen first-class matches for Canterbury from 2000 to 2004.

See also
 List of Canterbury representative cricketers

References

External links
 

1978 births
Living people
New Zealand cricketers
Canterbury cricketers
Cricketers from Christchurch